Rock Island Depot (or variations such as Rock Island Passenger Station) may refer to:

Any one of many railroad stations of the Rock Island Railroad

These include:

Arkansas

 Blue Mountain Depot
 Carlisle Rock Island Depot, Carlisle, Arkansas, listed on the National Register of Historic Places (NRHP) in Lonoke County, Arkansas
 Rock Island Railway Depot (Fordyce, Arkansas), listed on the NRHP in Dallas County, Arkansas
 Rock Island Depot (Hazen, Arkansas), listed on the NRHP in Prairie County, Arkansas
 Rock Island Depot (Lonoke, Arkansas), listed on the NRHP in Lonoke County, Arkansas
 Rock Island-Argenta Depot, North Little Rock, Arkansas, listed on the NRHP in Pulaski County, Arkansas
 Rock Island Depot-Weldon, Weldon, Arkansas, listed on the NRHP in Jackson County, Arkansas

Illinois

 Chilicothe Depot, Illinois
 Marseilles Depot
 Peoria Depot, Peoria, Illinois, NRHP-listed
 Rock Island Depot, NRHP-listed

Iowa

 Atlantic Depot
 Clarion Depot
 Council Bluffs Depot
 Des Moines
 Dows Depot
 Grinnell Union Depot
 Iowa City Depot
 Oskaloosa Depot, listed on the NRHP in Mahaska County, Iowa
 Pella Depot
 Rock Rapids Depot
 Stuart Depot
 Vinton Depot
 Walker Depot
 Wilton Depot

Kansas

 Rock Island Depot (Abilene, Kansas), listed on the NRHP in Dickinson County, Kansas
 Rock Island Depot (Wichita, Kansas), listed on the NRHP in Kansas

Minnesota

 Rock Island Depot (Faribault, Minnesota), listed on the NRHP in Minnesota

Nebraska

 Fairbury Rock Island Depot and Freight House, Fairbury, Nebraska, listed on the NRHP in Nebraska
 Rock Island Depot (Lincoln, Nebraska), listed on the NRHP in Nebraska

Oklahoma

 Rock Island Depot (Chickasha, Oklahoma), listed on the NRHP in Oklahoma
 Rock Island Depot (El Reno, Oklahoma), listed on the NRHP in Oklahoma
 Rock Island Depot (Enid, Oklahoma), listed on the NRHP in Oklahoma
 Rock Island Depot (Grandfield, Oklahoma), listed on the NRHP in Oklahoma
 Hobart Rock Island Depot, Hobart, Oklahoma, listed on the NRHP in Oklahoma
 Sayre Rock Island Depot, Sayre, Oklahoma, listed on the NRHP in Oklahoma
 Walters Rock Island Depot, Walters, Oklahoma, listed on the NRHP in Oklahoma
 Rock Island Passenger Station (Waurika, Oklahoma), listed on the NRHP in Oklahoma

South Dakota

 Sioux Falls Depot, listed on the NRHP in South Dakota

See also
 Chicago, Rock Island and Pacific Railroad Depot (disambiguation)
 Rock Island Railroad Bridge (Columbia River), Rock Island, Washington, listed on the NRHP in Washington
 Rock Island (disambiguation)